The Kresta I class, Soviet designation Project 1134 Berkut (golden eagle), was a class of guided missile cruiser built in the Soviet Union for the Soviet Navy. The ships were designed for a surface warfare role, but Soviet priorities were changed to an anti-submarine role and only four ships were built in this configuration.

Design
Initially it was planned to fit the SS-N-12 Sandbox (P-500 Bazalt) missile but the protracted development of this missile led to the older SS-N-3 being shipped. The self-defence armament was considerably increased as were command and communications facilities.

The Kresta Is could launch four SS-N-3b SLCMs and 44 SA-N-1 surface-to-air missiles with two twin launchers fore and aft, and had ten  torpedo tubes. A single Ka-25 Hormone B helicopter was carried for targeting the cruise missile, and mid-course corrections.

Variants
 Project 934: Variant armed with eight short range anti ship missiles (SS-N-9) otherwise similar to the ships built. This design evolved into the Kresta II class.
 Project 934K: This was a larger flagship variant with enlarged command facilities and a bigger hangar for four or five helicopters. This variant was cancelled.

Ships

The initial plan was for a single squadron of seven ships armed with long range missiles and two squadrons of fourteen ships armed with shorter range missiles. Only four ships were built before production switched to the anti-submarine variant the Kresta II class.

All the ships were built by the Zhdanov Shipyard in Leningrad.

See also
 List of ships of the Soviet Navy
 List of ships of Russia by project number

References
  Also published as

External links
 - Article in Russian
 - page from FAS in English
  All Russian Kresta I Class Cruisers - Complete Ship List

Cruiser classes
 
Ships of the Soviet Navy
Ship classes of the Russian Navy